A. H. Stephens State Park is a  Georgia state park located in Crawfordville. The park is named for Alexander Hamilton Stephens, the Vice President of the Confederate States of America, and a former Georgia governor. The park contains Stephens' home, Liberty Hall, which has been fully restored to its original 1875 style. The park's museum houses one of Georgia's largest collections of Civil War artifacts. The park also offers several mill ponds for fishing and nature trails.

The park is listed on the National Register of Historic Places as A. H. Stephens State Park. It includes four contributing sites, twelve contributing structures, and one other contributing object. It includes Colonial Revival and Rustic Style architecture.

History

The land of A. H. Stephens State Park was once owned by Alexander Hamilton Stephens, the Vice President of the Confederacy. After his death, the property came under the control of the Stephens Monument Commission, a group chartered to protect Liberty Hall and its surroundings.

The state received the land in 1933 to establish Georgia's third oldest state park. The federal government later acquired several hundred acres of land adjacent to the property. The current boundary of the park was completed by transferring ownership of this area to the state.

The museum was established in the 1950s after work by Ms. Horace Holden, Stephens' niece and a member of the United Daughters of the Confederacy, assisted to create it.

The park's civil engineering was built during the 1930s by the Civilian Conservation Corps and Works Progress Administration. The state acquired 15 acres of Taliaferro County Board of Education-owned property in 2001, which increased the park's current acreage.

Liberty Hall

The Liberty Hall, also known as Bachelor's Hall, built in 1834, is one of the structures on the site, and is separately listed on the NRHP. It is currently a National Historic Landmark maintained by the Georgia Department of Natural Resources. A. H. Stephens bought the estate in 1845, and lived in this house until 1875, when he tore down the main structure to construct Liberty Hall. The two-story "big house" is a traditional 4 × 4 with four rooms on each level.

Many of Stephens' books are housed in a smaller structure behind the facility, where he spent much of his time after the war. After Stephens's death in 1883, Liberty Hall, owned by his surviving relatives, served as a boardinghouse until 1932, when it was donated to the state of Georgia. The vice president's grave is on the front lawn, beneath a marble statue in his honor.

Facilities
21 Tent/trailer/RV campsites
4 Cottages
30 Horse stables
18 Horse campsites
1 Group camp
1 Pioneer campground
2 Picnic shelters
1 Group shelter

Annual events
Junior/Senior Fishing Rodeos (June)
Christmas on Lake Liberty (December)
Victorian Christmas Program (December)

References

External links

A.H. Stephens State Park

State parks of Georgia (U.S. state)
American Civil War sites
Historic districts on the National Register of Historic Places in Georgia (U.S. state)
Colonial Revival architecture in Georgia (U.S. state)
American Civil War museums in Georgia (U.S. state)
Historic house museums in Georgia (U.S. state)
Museums in Taliaferro County, Georgia
Protected areas established in 1995
Protected areas of Taliaferro County, Georgia
National Historic Landmarks in Georgia (U.S. state)
Houses completed in 1834
Houses in Taliaferro County, Georgia
National Register of Historic Places in Taliaferro County, Georgia
Alexander H. Stephens